Ripoli may refer to:

Bagno a Ripoli, a municipality in the Metropolitan city of Florence, Italy
Ripoli, Cascina, a village in the province of Pisa, Italy
Ripoli, Corropoli, a village in the province of Teramo, Italy
Ripoli, Dronero, a village in the province of Cuneo, Italy
Ripoli, San Benedetto Val di Sambro, a village in the Metropolitan city of Bologna, Italy